The 2019–20 S.V. Zulte Waregem season was the club's 19th season in existence and the 15th consecutive season in the top flight of Belgian football. In addition to the domestic league, Zulte Waregem participated in this season's edition of the Belgian Cup.

Players

On loan

Pre-season and friendlies

Competitions

Overall record

First Division A

League table

Results by round

Matches
On 2 April 2020, the Jupiler Pro League's board of directors proposed to cancel the season due to the COVID-19 pandemic. The General Assembly accepted the proposal on 15 May, and officially ended the 2019–20 season.

Belgian Cup

References 

S.V. Zulte Waregem seasons
Zulte Waregem